The kabosy is a box-shaped wooden guitar commonly played in music of Madagascar.  It has four to six strings and is commonly thought to be a direct descendant of the Arabic oud. The kabosy has staggered frets, many of which do not even cross the entire fretboard, and is generally tuned to an open chord.  

A kabosy-like instrument with standard frets is known as a mandalina or mandoliny.

Kabosys are frequently handmade from scavenged materials, and their form varies greatly depending on the builder and materials available.  Kabosys may be strung with nylon (often used fishing line) or steel (often from scrap wire or cable).

References

External links
Danny Carnahan.  Guitar Masters of Madagascar
Online kabosy lessons

Malagasy musical instruments
Guitar family instruments